Kosew  is a village in the administrative district of Gmina Świnice Warckie, within  Łęczyca, Łódź Voivodeship, in central Poland.

References

Kosew